XHPF-FM is a radio station on 101.9 FM in Mexicali. The station is owned by MVS Radio and carries its FM Globo romantic format.

History
XHPF received its first concession on February 23, 1976. The original concessionaire was Frecuencia Modulada de Mexicali, S.A.

XHPF had been among the last stations to carry the "FM Globo" name, which was used for decades by MVS. By 2018, just XHPF and XHARE-FM in Ojinaga, Chihuahua, were using it. However, the format has since expanded to stations in Guadalajara (XHLC-FM), Monterrey (XHJM-FM), Tuxtepec (XHUH-FM) and Tijuana (XHOCL-FM).

References

Radio stations in Mexicali
Radio stations established in 1976
MVS Radio